Dariusz Marzec (born 14 September 1969) is a Polish football manager and former player. He is currently in charge of III liga club Wieczysta Kraków.

References

1969 births
Living people
Footballers from Kraków
Association football midfielders
Polish footballers
Ekstraklasa players
Veikkausliiga players
Wisła Kraków players
GKS Katowice players
Athlitiki Enosi Larissa F.C. players
Kallithea F.C. players
Hutnik Nowa Huta players
Tampereen Pallo-Veikot players
Górnik Zabrze players
OKS Stomil Olsztyn players
GKS Bełchatów players
FC Jazz players
Proszowianka Proszowice players
Polish football managers
I liga managers
Stal Mielec managers
Arka Gdynia managers
Polish expatriate footballers
Expatriate footballers in Greece
Polish expatriate sportspeople in Greece
Expatriate footballers in Finland
Polish expatriate sportspeople in Finland